The Convergence for Development (Convergência para o Desenvolvimento) is a political party in the Chinese Special Administrative Region of Macau. Macau is a state in which political parties don't play a role. Though some civic groups put forward lists at the elections and might be considered parties. At the last elections in Macau, 25 September 2005, the group won 4.87% of the popular vote and 1 out of 12 popular elected seats.

Elected Members
David Chow Kam Fai (1996–2009)
Jorge Manuel Fão (2001-2005)

See also
 Politics of Macau

Political parties in Macau